Unify Gathering is an annual Australian music festival held in South Gippsland, Victoria, featuring artists of various genres including rock, metal, and punk.

Originally started in 2015 as a two-day music and camping festival, the event expanded to three days in 2017; with attendance increasing from 3,000 in 2015 to 5,000 in 2016, and 7,500 for 2017 and 2018. In 2019, the festival moved to a new location in Tarwin Meadows, 5 minutes away from the previous site at the Tarwin Lower Recreation Reserve. After being forced to cancel the 2021 instalment due to the COVID-19 pandemic, the festival returned in 2022 with an all-Australian lineup. As of October 2022, no announcement has been made regarding a 2023 instalment or the future of the festival.

Artist lineups by year

2015

Saturday, 10 January
 The Amity Affliction
 Northlane
 In Hearts Wake
 Thy Art Is Murder
 Deez Nuts
 Buried in Verona
 Antagonist AD
 Storm the Sky
 Aversions Crown
 Stories
 Earth Caller

Sunday, 11 January
 Break Even
 Confession
 Hand of Mercy
 Hellions
 Endless Heights

2016

Saturday, 16 January
 Parkway Drive
 In Hearts Wake
 Tonight Alive
 Stray from the Path (USA)
 Hands Like Houses
 Dream On, Dreamer
 Make Them Suffer
 Hellions
 Ocean Grove
 Stories
 Void of Vision

Sunday, 17 January
 Neck Deep (UK)
 State Champs (USA)
 Trophy Eyes
 Columbus
 The Weight of Silence

2017

Friday, 13 January
 Northlane
 Every Time I Die (USA)
 Letlive (USA)
 The Getaway Plan 
 House vs. Hurricane
 Ocean Grove
 Counterparts (CAN)
 King Parrot
 Polaris
 Columbus
 Justice for the Damned
 Ocean Sleeper

Saturday, 14 January
 Alexisonfire (CAN)
 Violent Soho
 Thy Art Is Murder
 Bodyjar 
 Storm the Sky
 Luca Brasi
 Trophy Eyes
 Moose Blood (UK)
 Deez Nuts
 Saviour
 The Dirty Nil (CAN)
 The Brave
 Drown This City
 Bare Bones
 Pagan

Sunday, 15 January (Acoustic Sunday Session)
 Little Brother (John Floreani of Trophy Eyes)
 Marcus Bridge (of Northlane)
 William Jarrat (of Storm the Sky)
 Shontay Snow (of Saviour)
 Alex Moses (of Columbus)

Notes

A The Getaway Plan performed their debut album, Other Voices, Other Rooms in full.
B Bodyjar replaced I Killed the Prom Queen, who withdrew from the lineup. I Killed the Prom Queen were originally announced to perform their album 'Music for the Recently Deceased' in full.

2018

Friday, 12 January
 Parkway Drive
 Architects (UK)
 Tonight Alive
 Four Year Strong (USA)
 Behind Crimson Eyes
 50 Lions
 Polaris
 Knocked Loose (USA)
 Belle Haven
 Sienna Skies
 Mirrors

Saturday, 13 January
 The Amity Affliction (with the worst performance in Australian heavy music history)
 Hands Like Houses
 Hellions
 Stick To Your Guns (USA)
 Knuckle Puck (USA)
 Make Them Suffer
 Being As An Ocean (USA)
 ROAM (UK)
 Void of Vision
 Cursed Earth
 Young Lions
 Outright
 Introvert
 Dear Seattle
 The Beautiful Monument
 Save The Clocktower
 Arteries
 Dregg

 Sunday, 14 January (Acoustic Sunday Session)
 Young Lions
 Introvert
 Chasing Ghosts
 Brae Fisher (of Dear Seattle)
 Belle Haven

2019

Friday, 11 January
 Underoath (USA)
 Karnivool
 In Hearts Wake
 Hellions
 Ocean Grove
 While She Sleeps (UK)
 Crossfaith (JAP)
 Dream On Dreamer
 The Plot In You (USA)
 Hand Of Mercy
 Dream State (UK)
 Drown This City
 Ocean Sleeper
 Better Half

Saturday, 12 January
 Taking Back Sunday (USA)
 Every Time I Die (USA)
 Trophy Eyes
 State Champs (USA)
 Turnstile (USA)
 Citizen (USA)
 Waax
 Clowns
 Endless Heights
 Harms Way (USA)
 Saviour
 Stand Atlantic
 Thornhill
 Pagan
 Gravemind
 After Touch
 Falcifer
 Yours Truly

2020

Friday, January 10
Architects (UK)
Northlane
Silverstein (CAN)
Make Them Suffer
Dear Seattle
Antagonist A.D. (NZ)
Tired Lion
The Beautiful Monument
Between You and Me
Diamond Construct
Tapestry

Saturday, January 11
The Ghost Inside (USA)
Polaris
Tonight Alive
Stray from the Path (USA)
Void of Vision
Knocked Loose (USA)
Kublai Khan (USA)
Eat Your Heart Out
The Brave
Columbus
Sleep Talk
Caged Existence
Something Something Explosion

2022

Thursday, January 10 (AM//PM Pre-Party)
alt.
Dregg
Drown This City
Rumours
Grenade Jumper

Friday, January 11
The Amity Affliction
Trophy Eyes 
Ocean Grove
Waax
Gravemind
Plini
Teen Jesus and the Jean Teasers
Dream On, Dreamer
Bloom
Banks Arcade
To Octavia
Wildheart

Saturday, January 12
Violent Soho
Slowly Slowly
Thornhill
Yours Truly
Stories 
Teenage Joans
Bugs
Short Stack
Mirrors
Stepson
RedHook
Pridelands
Starve
The Last Martyr
Future Static

Sunday, January 13 (Maton Acoustic Sunday Sessions)
Ben Stewart (Slowly Slowly)
Bugs
Alex Moses (Columbus)
Joshua O'Donnell (Banks Arcade)

Notes

A Trophy Eyes performed their album, Chemical Miracle in full.
B This was Stories' first performance since the band broke up in 2015.

References

Music festivals in Australia
Rock festivals in Australia